Adventures in Public School is a 2017 Canadian teen comedy film directed by Kyle Rideout, who also co-wrote the screenplay with Josh Epstein. It stars Judy Greer, Daniel Doheny, Siobhan Williams, Andrew McNee, Andrew Herr, Russell Peters, and Grace Park.

The film had its world premiere at the Toronto International Film Festival on September 9, 2017, under the title Public Schooled. It was released in the United States on April 27, 2018, by Gravitas Ventures.

Plot

Cast

Production
In October 2016, it was announced Judy Greer had been cast in the film, with Kyle Rideout directing from a screenplay he co-wrote with Josh Epstein. Epstein served as a producer on the film, while Justine Whyte and Adam Folk served as executive producer and co-producer respectively. The Canadian Film Centre and Telefilm Canada co-financed the film. In November 2016, Russell Peters and Daniel Doheny joined the cast of the film.

Filming
Principal photography took place in Vancouver, Canada, from November to December 2016.

Release
The film had its world premiere at the Toronto International Film Festival on September 9, 2017. Shortly after, Gravitas Ventures acquired U.S. distribution rights to the film. It was released theatrically and through video on demand on April 27, 2018.

In December, the Toronto International Film Festival named the film to its annual Canada's Top Ten list of the ten best Canadian films.

Reception

Critical response
On review aggregator Rotten Tomatoes, the film holds an approval rating of 75% based on 8 reviews, with an average rating of 5.90/10.

Awards
Rideout received a nomination for the Directors Guild of Canada's DGC Discovery Award.

References

External links
 
 
 Adventures in Public School at Library and Archives Canada

2017 films
2010s coming-of-age comedy films
2010s high school films
2010s teen comedy films
Canadian coming-of-age comedy films
Canadian Film Centre films
Canadian teen comedy films
English-language Canadian films
Films shot in Vancouver
2010s English-language films
2010s Canadian films